This is a list of episodes  of the Canadian sitcom Sophie. The series debuted on CBC Television on January 9, 2008. The first season consisted of 13 episodes and the second season consisted of 19 episodes. The series was cancelled by CBC on March 27, 2009. No plans for DVD releases have been announced.

Season 1 (2008)

Season 2 (2008–2009)

Sophie